Awards and decorations of the United States Coast Guard are military medals and ribbons of the United States Coast Guard which are currently issued under the authority of the Department of Homeland Security.

Prior to 2002, such awards were issued by the Secretary of Transportation and Coast Guard personnel were eligible to receive a variety of Department of Transportation (DOT) civilian decorations.  Since transferring to the Department of Homeland Security, the issuance of DOT awards has been discontinued in the Coast Guard, although such awards may still be seen on active duty Coast Guard uniforms.

Coast Guard military awards are similar to U.S. Navy awards (often with nearly identical ribbons save for an additional white stripe) and Coast Guard personnel are eligible to receive all inter-service awards and decorations, authorized foreign awards and international decorations.

The current active awards and decorations of the U.S. Coast Guard are as follows:

Coast Guard Medals

Personal Awards and Decorations

Coast Guard Good Conduct and Service Medals

Coast Guard Lifesaving Medals

Coast Guard Unit Awards

Coast Guard Ribbons

Coast Guard Marksmanship Awards/Medals

Order of precedence 
The following is the ribbon order of precedence authorized for wear by the U.S. Coast Guard.  The list contains awards and decorations for the departments of Defense (including Army, Navy and Air Force), Homeland Security and Transportation:

Key:
Bold = denotes agency-level (DHS or DOT) award or U.S. Coast Guard award
Bold italic = denotes U.S. Coast Guard award is obsolete
Italic = denotes award is obsolete

Personal decorations

Unit decorations

Conduct medals

U.S. service, campaign and training awards
Authorized non-U.S. service awards and foreign decorations
Marksmanship awards

References

  

 
United States Coast Guard lists